Shawn King (born June 24, 1972) is a former National Football League defensive end who played for the Carolina Panthers and Indianapolis Colts. He is best remembered for his numerous suspensions due to violating the NFL's drug policy.

NFL career
Shawn King was drafted in the second round of the 1995 draft by the Carolina Panthers. King was first drug violation came in 1995 during his rookie training camp after testing positive for marijuana. King played in 13 games his rookie season and in all 16 games the following season. However, after testing positive again, King was suspended for the first six games of the 1997 season, only appearing in 9 games. After yet another positive test, King found himself suspended for the entire 1998 season. Prior to the 1999 season, King signed a three-year, $6 million contract with the Indianapolis Colts and started 8 of the team's first 9 games, but was suspended again (along with teammate Tito Wooten), this time for four games due to showing up late to a meeting. The Colts later cut King and he was suspended yet again by the league for 12 months for another drug violation and missed the entire 2000 season. Though he was reinstated in January 2001, King chose to retire from the NFL citing the league's drug policy as a reason. After four season of retirement, King signed on to play with the AFL's Tampa Bay Storm for the 2004 AFL season, after which he left pro football for good.

Suspensions
Shawn King was active in the NFL for six seasons from 1995 to 2000. However, due to suspensions, King missed 42 games, including the entire 1998 and 2000 seasons. King retired from the NFL in January 2001 shortly after the league reinstated him due to his problems with the drug policy.

1995 - Placed in the NFL's intervention program after violating the NFL's drug policy
1997 - Suspended for six games during the 1997 season due to violating the NFL's drug policy
1998 - Suspended for the entire 1998 season due to violating the NFL's drug policy
1999 - Suspended for four games during the 1999 season due after missing bed check and showing up late to a team meeting
2000 - Suspended for the entire 2000 season after violating NFL's drug policy

References

1972 births
Living people
African-American players of American football
American football defensive ends
American sportspeople in doping cases
Carolina Panthers players
Indianapolis Colts players
LSU Tigers football players
Louisiana–Monroe Warhawks football players
Tampa Bay Storm players
21st-century African-American sportspeople
20th-century African-American sportspeople